Modbury SC, commonly known as Modbury Jets, is an Australian semi-professional soccer club based in Adelaide, South Australia. It's senior mens teams currently compete in the National Premier Leagues South Australia and senior womens team in the Women's State League. The club also fields junior teams for girls and boys. The seniors play their home matches at Smith Partners Stadium in Ridgehaven, north of Adelaide and the Juniors play at Burragah Reserve, Modbury North.

Modbury Soccer Club has a proud footballing history dating back to 1964. A not-for-profit community sporting club, Modbury SC is affiliated with FIFA through its membership of Football South Australia, the South Australian Amateur Soccer League, and the national peak body, Football Federation of Australia.

Over the last 59 years, Modbury Soccer Club has grown from its original ‘working men’s’ foundation to one that has demonstrated a long-term commitment to developing and nurturing local footballing talent in Adelaide's north-east, while encouraging children, youth and adults to adopt a healthier lifestyle and greater physical activity participating in an affordable sporting program. The Club caters for all age groups and abilities and fields teams in Senior Men's and Senior Women's, Junior boys and girls, and MiniRoos competitions. The club also fields teams in the SA Amateur Soccer Soccer League.

Modbury Jets SC is arguably the most high-profile club representing the City of Tea Tree Gully in sporting competitions and codes.

History
The club was first founded in 1964, however they were forced to wait a year in order to play in the 1965 season. For reasons unknown, they played in the 3rd division reserve league while their reserve side played in the 4th division.

The club almost became the Modbury Prague Soccer Club in 1968 when members of the Czechoslovakian Australian community in the area wanted to promote the game at Modbury. However the move was abandoned when club members vetoed the idea.

The club's facilities have been steadily improving over the years. Its ground was selected as one of the training venues for teams competing in the 2000 Olympic Games.
Modbury is a popular community based club located in the Modbury/Tea Tree Gully area. The club fields both seniors and juniors teams.

In 2014, the Jets celebrated their fiftieth year as a club, and finished the season by clinching promotion through the play-off finals series.

Current squad

Club honours
 1973 SASF Third Division Champions
 1973 Barker Cup Winners
 1975 Second Division Champions
 1989 PGH Federation Cup Winners
 2004 Federation Cup Runners-Up
 1991 Bailetti Cup Winners
 1992 Ampol Cup Runners-Up
 1994 Coca-Cola Under 23 Cup Winners
 1998 State League Minor Premiers
 1998 State League Champions
 1998 Under 23 Champions
 1998 Under 19 Champions
 2000 Premier League Runners-Up
 2001 Premier League Runners-Up
 2001 Under 23 Cup Winners
 2004 Under 19 Premier League Champions
 2006 Len Alagich Cup Winner
 2007 Micky Dye Cup Winner
 2010 Premier League Winners
 2010 Reserves Premier League Winners
 2010 Under 19 Premier League Winners
 2011 Under 19 Cup Runners-Up
 2013 Reserves State League Winners
 2014 Reserves State League Winners
 2014 State League Playoff Champions
 2016 Under 18 Cup Runners-Up
 2018 Under 18 State League 1 Champions
 2019 State League 1 Premiers
 2019 Reserves State League 1 Premiers
 2019 U18s State League 1 Champions
 2019 Reserves State League 1 Champions
 2021 U18s State League 1 Runners-Up
 2021 Reserves State League 1 Champions

Football SA Player Awards
Roy Burdett, 2nd Division Player of the Year (1975)

Carl Whitehead, SASF Player of Year (1995)

Ross Fedele, State League Reserves Player of the Year (1998)

Mark Yates, SASF Player of Year (2000)

Mason Somerville, State League Player of the Year (2004)

David Crowl, State League Player of the Year (2010)

Brandon Pirone, State League U19s Player of the Year (2010)

Nathan Cheetham, State League U19s Player of the Year (2012)

Charlie Bowman, State League Golden Boot (2014)

James Levett, State League 1 U18s Player of the Year (2018)

Shaun McGreevy, State League 1 Golden Boot (2018)

Shaun McGreevy/Joshua Farrell, State League 1 Golden Boot (2019)

Kieran Griffiths, State League 1 Goalkeeper of the Year (2019)

Jokew Wuol, NPL U18s Player of the Year (2020)

Brayden, State League 1 U18s Player of the Year (2021)

Football SA Coaching Awards
Earl Pudler, Premier League Coach of the Year (2010)

Jason Trimboli, State League 1 Coach of the Year (2019)

Club Record Holders (1993–2022)
Senior Games Record Holder:  Matt Kelly (252)

Senior Record Goal Scorer:  Charlie Bowman (56)

Players/Former Player Achievements

Jacob Melling – Under 17s Australian Representative at 2011 Mexico World Cup

Brandon Borrello – 1. FC Kaiserslautern and Australia U23s Representative

Bradden Inman – Current Rochdale A.F.C player

Notable players

 Aaron Westervelt
 Louis Brain
 Kristian Rees
 Jacob Melling
 Bradden Inman
 Aaron Goulding

References

External links
 Official Website

National Premier Leagues clubs
Soccer clubs in Adelaide
Association football clubs established in 1964
1964 establishments in Australia